WQUL is a daytime-only classic country radio station located in Woodruff, South Carolina, south of the Greenville-Spartanburg area. The station is licensed by the Federal Communications Commission (FCC) to broadcast on 1510 AM with a power of 1,000 watts during the day and 250 watts during critical hours. WQUL also broadcasts at 95.9 FM on translator W240BO and at 101.7 FM on translator W269DM.

History
The station formerly operated a southern gospel format until purchased in 2004 by T.C. Lewis. Lewis changed the format a few times before he found the niche in Oldies, featuring music from the 1950s, 1960s, 1970s and Beach. He has 23 years of experience in radio in both AM and FM formats. When T.C. bought WDRF 1510, he wanted to take the station and make it community affiliated. WQUL accomplishes this by carrying all the Woodruff Wolverine Football, Baseball, Soccer and Softball games, and also keeps the citizens of Woodruff and Southern Spartanburg County informed on events in the area. The station is also an affiliate of the Tar Heel Sports Network; carrying both football and basketball games.

On March 1, 2015, WQUL switched from classic hits to classic country.

Effective December 5, 2019, BJL Broadcasting sold WQUL and translator W269DM to Bob Corlew's New Mountains to Climb, LLC for $70,000.

External links
WQUL Website

QUL
Radio stations established in 1967
1967 establishments in South Carolina
QUL